Vira Parakramabahu VIII, also known as Ambulagala Kumara, was King of Kotte in the fifteenth century, who ruled from 1484 to 1518. He succeeded Parakramabahu VII and was succeeded by his son Dharma Parakramabahu IX. Another son Vijayabahu VII also became king.

An adopted son of Parakramabahu VI, he overthrew Panditha Parakramabahu VII, the son of Sirisangabo Bhuvanaikabahu VI (another adopted son of Parakramabahu VI) and claimed the throne of Kotte.

The Portuguese led-by Lourenço de Almeida arrived at Sri Lanka in 1505 during his reign, and diplomatic ties with the Portuguese Empire were initiated. The Portuguese who met the king, made an agreement that they would protect the coastal region of the country, and as payback the king should pay a tribute of 80 tons of Cinnamon to them.

During the end of Parakramabahu VIII's lifetime, he divided his kingdom among his sons, and made the eldest son Dharma Parakramabahu as the next heir to the throne.

See also
 List of Sri Lankan monarchs
 History of Sri Lanka

References

External links
 Kings & Rulers of Sri Lanka
 Codrington's Short History of Ceylon

Monarchs of Kotte
House of Siri Sanga Bo
P
 Sinhalese Buddhist monarchs
P
P